Statistics of Bahraini Premier League for the 1995–96 season.

Overview
Al-Ahli won the championship.

Championship playoff

References
Bahrain - List of final tables (RSSSF)

Bahraini Premier League seasons
Bah
1995–96 in Bahraini football